The second USS Magnet (AM-260) was an Admirable-class minesweeper built for the U.S. Navy during World War II. She was built to clear minefields in offshore waters, and served the Navy in the Atlantic Ocean.

Career
Magnet was laid down by American Shipbuilding Co., Lorain, Ohio, 13 March 1943; launched 5 June 1943; sponsored by Mrs. John J. Boland; and commissioned 10 March 1944.

Following commissioning in the 9th Naval District, Magnet steamed down the Mississippi River en route to Norfolk, Virginia, reporting 17 April 1944. After shakedown in the Chesapeake Bay, she joined Mine Division 31 and, for the next 9 months operated out of Recife, Brazil, sweeping the main shipping channels of South American ports. She also escorted convoys to and from the West Indies, patrolled the harbor, and engaged in antisubmarine training.

On 10 March 1945 she was detached from the South Atlantic Forces and assigned to task group TG 23.2 at Miami, Florida. There she served as a school ship until 28 June, when she got underway for Norfolk.

On 18 August, after a brief overhaul, she returned to Miami, where she decommissioned on the 28th. Transferred to the Nationalist Chinese Government under the terms of lend lease the same day, she commissioned in that Navy as Yung Ning. The vessel was officially returned in accordance with the terms of the original loan, and then redelivered to the Republic of China under the Military Assistance Program, 7 February 1948. Magnet was struck from the Navy list 12 March 1948. She is believed to have been scrapped.

References

External links
 NavSource Online: Mine Warfare Vessel Photo Archive - Magnet (AM-260)
 Republic Of China Navy Photo Archive

Admirable-class minesweepers
Ships built in Lorain, Ohio
1943 ships
World War II minesweepers of the United States
Admirable-class minesweepers of the Republic of China Navy